The Malta Jazz Festival is an annual musical event held every July in Malta, organised by Festivals Malta (previously part of Arts Council Malta and the Malta Council for Culture and the Arts). It is held outside Our Lady of Liesse Church, on the Valletta waterfront.

History

The festival was established in 1990 by Charles 'City' Gatt and has featured world-renowned jazz musicians such as Wayne Shorter, John Patitucci, Diana Krall, Chick Corea, Al Di Meola, Natalie Cole, Betty Carter, Michel Petrucciani, Richard Bona and Mike Stern.

In 2006, the event was controversially removed from the artistic directorship of Gatt, a pioneer of Maltese jazz, and placed in the hands of private promotion company N'n'G, who attempted to style it into a more populist 'Rock and Jazz' festival. Subsequent line-ups almost entirely bereft of contemporary jazz content and mainly featuring a host of passé rock musicians, reformed prog rock acts and tribute bands led the festival into a period of brief decline.

2009 saw the festival return to its roots under the directorship of Maltese musician Sandro Zerafa with a line-up of world-renowned jazz musicians. Among the artists who performed at the 2010 festival were Bill Stewart, Ari Hoenig, Greg Hutchinson, Dave Weckl, Dave King, Mike Stern and Richard Bona. The 2011 festival featured Lionel Loueke, Joao Bosco, Monty Alexander and Avishai Cohen. The 2012 festival took place on July 19, 20 and 21 and included performances by Al Di Meola, Terri Lyne Carrington, Chano Dominguez, Tigran Hamasyan, Dianne Reeves, Jeremy Pelt and Will Vinson.

The 2013 festival was staged on July 18, 19 and 20, featuring the Robert Glasper Experiment, Vijay Iyer Trio, Gregory Porter, Michel Camilo Trio, Gilad Hekselman Quartet, Charles 'City' Gatt Vibraphone Quintet, Gerald Clayton Trio (featuring Logan Richardson), Cusp and Walter Vella Quartet.

Among the acts appearing at the 2014 festival were Warren Wolf, Tom Harrell (featuring Jaleel Shaw, Johnathan Blake, Esperanza Spalding, Wayne Escoffery and Ugonna Okegwo), Kneebody, Brecker Brothers Band Reunion (featuring Terry Bozzio), Laurent Coq's Dialogue Trio, Ada Rovatti, Barry Finnerty, Neil Jason, Brad Mehldau and Mark Guiliana. Mehldau and Guiliana performed as their synthesizer-oriented duo project "Mehliana". The festival took place between July 17 and 19.

The 2015 festival took place between July 16 and 19. Among the acts on stage were Danilo Perez, John Patitucci, Brian Blade, Dave Holland, Chris Potter, Lionel Loueke, Eric Harland, David Binney, Chucho Valdes, Kurt Elling, Soweto Kinch, Joe Cohn and Richard Bona.

For 2016, the festival moved away from  Ta` Liesse for its opening night, which took place at Valletta's City Gate. Among the acts at the 2016 festival were headliner Mike Stern, Snarky Puppy, Omer Avital, Harold López-Nussa and pianist Marcus Roberts' trio. This 26th edition of the festival took place between July 21 and 23.

The 2017 festival was staged between July 20 and 22, featuring acts including Mark Guiliana, Al di Meola, Antonio Sanchez, Nicholas Payton and Munir Hossn.  The 2018 Malta Jazz Festival was headlined by Chick Corea, John Patitucci and Dave Weckl. The festival took place between July 16 and 21.

The 2019 festival took place between July 15 and 20. Some of the main acts performing were Jazzmeia Horn, Kenny Garrett, Ozmosys (featuring Omar Hakim) and Chucho Valdés. The festival also featured local acts such as the William Smith Trio, Dominic Galea and Malta Concert Orchestra's Big Band together with Joe Cutajar. Due to the outbreak of Coronavirus, the 2020 edition of the festival took place in a reduced format between July 13 and 18, including virtual masterclasses, an internet channel featuring rare broadcasts of concerts from the festival's archives and a virtual exhibition of photography. The 2021 festival took place in a reduced 'City Jazz Series' format between July 12 and 17 with appearances from Danny Grissett, Chiara Pancadli and Darryl Hall, Yonathan Avishai, Felipe Cabrera 'Mirror' and Dmitry Baevsky 4tet.

The 2022 edition of the festival took place between July 11 and 16. It featured, among others, Clark Tracey & Dominic Galea Legacy Quintet, The Blue Tangerine, Francesco Ciniglio “Locomotive Suite”, Yusan, Danny Grissett Trio, John Scofield’s “Yankee Go Home”, Warren Galea Trio, Joel Ross “Good Vibes”, Richard Bona & Alfredo Rodriguez and Daniele Cordisco quintet. The festival was dedicated to the memory of the event's founder, Charles 'City' Gatt, who died in February 2022.

Lineups

References

External links
Official Site of the Malta Jazz Festival
Malta Jazz Festival Blog
The Times of Malta

1990 establishments in Malta
Recurring events established in 1990
Jazz festivals in Malta
Summer events in Malta
July events
Culture in Valletta